This is a list of notable past and present residents of the U.S. city of Austin, Texas, and its surrounding metropolitan area.  It does not include people whose only connection with the city is attending the University of Texas; see: List of University of Texas at Austin alumni.

A to E

F to Q

R to Z

See also

 Music of Austin

References

Austin, Texas
Austin
People